Mae West (born Mary Jane West; August 17, 1893 – November 22, 1980) was an American stage and film actress, playwright, screenwriter, singer, and sex symbol whose entertainment career spanned over seven decades. She was known for her breezy sexual independence, and her lighthearted bawdy double entendres, often delivered in a husky contralto voice. She was active in vaudeville and on stage in New York City before moving to Los Angeles to begin a career in the film industry.

West was one of the most controversial movie stars of her day; she encountered problems especially with censorship. She once quipped, "I believe in censorship. I made a fortune out of it." She bucked the system by making comedy out of conventional mores, and the Depression-era audience admired her for it. When her film career ended, she wrote books and plays, and continued to perform in Las Vegas and the United Kingdom, on radio and television, and recorded rock 'n roll albums. In 1999, the American Film Institute posthumously voted West the 15th greatest female screen legend of classic American cinema.

Early life and career
Mary Jane West was born on August 17, 1893, in Brooklyn (either Greenpoint or Bushwick, before New York City was consolidated in 1898). She was delivered at home by an aunt who was a midwife. She was the eldest surviving child of John Patrick West and Mathilde "Tillie" (later Matilda) Delker (originally Doelger; later Americanized to "Delker" or "Dilker"). Tillie and her five siblings had emigrated with their parents, Jakob and Christiana (née Brüning) Doelger from Bavaria in 1886. West's parents married on January 18, 1889, in Brooklyn, to the pleasure of the groom's parents and the displeasure of the bride's, and raised their children as Protestants.

West's father was a prizefighter known as "Battlin' Jack West" who later worked as a "special policeman" and later had his own private investigations agency. Her mother was a former corset and fashion model. Her paternal grandmother, Mary Jane (née Copley), for whom she was named, was a Catholic of Irish descent and West's paternal grandfather, John Edwin West, was of English–Scots descent and a ship's rigger.

Her eldest sibling, Katie, died in infancy. Her other siblings were Mildred Katherine West, later known as Beverly, and John Edwin West II (sometimes inaccurately called "John Edwin West, Jr."). During her childhood, West's family moved to various parts of Woodhaven, as well as the Williamsburg and Greenpoint neighborhoods of Brooklyn. In Woodhaven, at Neir's Social Hall (which opened in 1829 and is still extant), West supposedly first performed professionally.

Beginning of stage career

West was five when she first entertained a crowd at a church social, and she started appearing in amateur shows at the age of seven. She often won prizes at local talent contests. She began performing professionally in vaudeville in the Hal Clarendon Stock Company in 1907 at the age of 14. West first performed under the stage name "Baby Mae", and tried various personas, including a male impersonator.

She used the alias "Jane Mast" early in her career. Her trademark walk was said to have been inspired or influenced by female impersonators Bert Savoy and Julian Eltinge, who were famous during the Pansy Craze. Her first appearance in a Broadway show, at age 18, was in a 1911 revue A La Broadway put on by her former dancing teacher, Ned Wayburn. The show folded after eight performances, but West was discovered and singled out for praise by a New York Times reviewer, who wrote that a "girl named Mae West, hitherto unknown, pleased by her grotesquerie and snappy way of singing and dancing". West next appeared in a show called Vera Violetta, whose cast featured Al Jolson. In 1912, she appeared in the opening performance of A Winsome Widow as a "baby vamp" named La Petite Daffy.

She was encouraged as a performer by her mother, who, according to West, always thought that anything Mae did was fantastic. Other family members were less encouraging, including an aunt and her paternal grandmother. They are all reported as having disapproved of her career and her choices. In 1918, after exiting several high-profile revues, West finally got her break in the Shubert Brothers revue Sometime, opposite Ed Wynn. Her character Mayme danced the shimmy and her photograph appeared on an edition of the sheet music for the popular number "Ev'rybody Shimmies Now".

Broadway star and jail
Eventually, West began writing her own risqué plays using the pen name Jane Mast. Her first starring role on Broadway was in a 1926 play entitled Sex, which she wrote, produced, and directed. Although conservative critics panned the show, ticket sales were strong. The production did not go over well with city officials, who had received complaints from some religious groups, and the theater was raided, with West arrested along with the cast. She was taken to the Jefferson Market Court House, (now Jefferson Market Library), where she was prosecuted on morals charges, and on April 19, 1927, was sentenced to 10 days for "corrupting the morals of youth". Though West could have paid a fine and been let off, she chose the jail sentence for the publicity it would garner. While incarcerated on Welfare Island (now known as Roosevelt Island), she dined with the warden and his wife; she told reporters that she had worn her silk panties while serving time, in lieu of the "burlap"  the other girls had to wear. West got great mileage from this jail stint. She served eight days with two days off for "good behavior". Media attention surrounding the incident enhanced her career, by crowning her the darling "bad girl" who "had climbed the ladder of success wrong by wrong".

Her next play, The Drag, dealt with homosexuality, and was what West called one of her "comedy-dramas of life". After a series of try-outs in Connecticut and New Jersey, West announced she would open the play in New York. However, The Drag never opened on Broadway, owing to efforts by the New York Society for the Suppression of Vice to ban any attempt by West to stage it. West explained, "The city fathers begged me not to bring the show to New York because they were not equipped to handle the commotion it would cause." West was an early supporter of the women's liberation movement, but said she was not a "burn your bra" type of feminist. Since the 1920s, she was also an early supporter of gay rights, and publicly declared against police brutality that gay men experienced. She adopted a then "modern" psychological explanation that gay men were women's souls in men's bodies, and hitting a gay man was akin to hitting a woman. In her 1959 autobiography Goodness Had Nothing to Do With It, a memoir compiled by ghostwriter Stephen Longstreet, West strongly objects to hypocrisy while also disparaging homosexuality: This perspective, never elaborated upon by West in other books or interviews, seems inconsistent with the Mae West persona, for in her 1975 book Mae West: Sex, Health, and ESP, writing:

Between the late 1920s and early 1930s, West continued to write plays, including The Wicked Age, Pleasure Man, and The Constant Sinner. Her productions predictably aroused controversy, which ensured that she stayed in the news and often resulted in packed houses at her performances. Her 1928 play Diamond Lil, a story about a racy, easygoing, and ultimately very smart lady of the 1890s, became a Broadway hit and cemented West's image in the public's eye. This show had an enduring popularity and West successfully revived it many times throughout the course of her career.

Three years after the initial success of Diamond Lil, West portrayed another sexually charged character,  Babe Gordon, in The Constant Sinner, which opened on Broadway at the Royale Theatre on September 14, 1931. The influential drama critic for The New York Times, J. Brooks Atkinson, was among many reviewers at the time who bashed the play's storyline as well as West's performance. Atkinson's "scathing" assessment of her three-act production was published in The Times the day after the dramedy's premiere:

Other prominent reviewers in 1931, like Atkinson, roundly criticized the stage production, calling it a "clumsy drama", "deliberately outlandish", and labeling West herself as an "atrocious playwright". Ultimately, the elaborate play closed on Broadway after just eight weeks and 64 performances. When compared to Diamond Lil, which had run for nine months with 323 performances, The Constant Sinner was critically, financially, and personally a disappointment for West. Nevertheless, its notoriety and even its negative reviews further enhanced her public image as a daring, sensational performer and brought her additional widespread media attention. During that time, in the months after the play closed, West decided to put her stage career on hold and to accept a short-term but lucrative contract offer from Paramount Pictures to perform in a feature film in Hollywood.

Motion pictures and censorship

In June 1932, after signing a two-month contract with Paramount that provided her a weekly salary of $5,000 ($ today), West left New York by train for California. The veteran stage performer was by then nearly 40 years old, an unusually late age to begin a film career, especially for women, although Paramount certainly never had the slightest intention of casting her as an ingénue. She nonetheless managed to keep her age ambiguous for some time. She made her film debut in the role of Maudie Triplett in Night After Night (1932) starring George Raft, who had suggested West for the part. At first she did not like her small supporting role in the drama, but was appeased when she was allowed to rewrite portions of her character's dialogue. One of several revisions she made is in her first scene in Night After Night, when a hat-check girl exclaims, "Goodness, what beautiful diamonds", and West replies, "Goodness had nothing to do with it, dearie." Reflecting on the overall result of her rewritten scenes, Raft is reported to have said, "She stole everything but the cameras."

For her next role for Paramount, West brought her Diamond Lil character, now renamed "Lady Lou", to the screen in She Done Him Wrong (1933). The film was one of Cary Grant's early major roles, which boosted his career. West claimed she spotted Grant at the studio and insisted that he be cast as the male lead. She claimed to have told a Paramount director, "If he can talk, I'll take him!" The film was a box office hit and earned an Academy Award nomination for Best Picture. The success of the film saved Paramount from bankruptcy, grossing over $2 million, the equivalent of $140 million today. Paramount recognizes that debt of gratitude today, with a building on the lot named after West.

Her next release, I'm No Angel (1933), teamed her again with Grant. The film was also a box-office hit and was the most successful of her entire screen career. In the months after its release, references to West could be found almost everywhere, from the song lyrics of Cole Porter, to a Works Progress Administration (WPA) mural of San Francisco's newly built Coit Tower, to She Done Him Right, a Pooch the Pup cartoon, to "My Dress Hangs There", a painting by Mexican artist Frida Kahlo. Kahlo's husband, Diego Rivera, paid his own tribute: "West is the most wonderful machine for living I have ever knownunfortunately on the screen only." To F. Scott Fitzgerald, West was especially unique: "The only Hollywood actress with both an ironic edge and a comic spark." As Variety put it, "Mae West's films have made her the biggest conversation-provoker, free-space grabber, and all-around box office bet in the country. She's as hot an issue as Hitler."

By 1933, West was one of the largest box-office draws in the United States and, by 1935, she was also the highest paid woman and the second-highest paid person in the United States (after William Randolph Hearst). Hearst invited West to Hearst Castle, his massive estate in San Simeon, California, where Hollywood celebrities and prominent political and business figures frequently gathered to socialize. "I could'a married him," West later commented, "but I got no time for parties. I don't like those big crowds." On July 1, 1934, the censorship guidelines of the film industry's Production Code began to be meticulously enforced. As a result, West's scripts were subjected to more  editing. She, in turn, would often intentionally place extremely risqué lines in her scripts, knowing they would be cut by the censors. She hoped they would then not object as much to her other less suggestive lines. Her next film was Belle of the Nineties (1934). The original title, It Ain't No Sin, was changed because of censors' objections. Despite Paramount's early objections regarding costs, West insisted the studio hire Duke Ellington and his orchestra to accompany her in the film's musical numbers. Their collaboration was a success; the classic "My Old Flame" (recorded by Duke Ellington) was introduced in this film. Her next film, Goin' to Town (1935), received mixed reviews, as censorship continued to take its toll by preventing West from including her best lines.

Her following effort, Klondike Annie (1936) dealt, as best it could given the heavy censorship, with religion and hypocrisy. Some critics called the film her magnum opus, but not everyone agreed. Press baron and film mogul William Randolph Hearst, ostensibly offended by an off-handed remark West made about his mistress, Marion Davies, sent a private memo to all his editors stating, "That Mae West picture Klondike Annie is a filthy picture... We should have editorials roasting that picture, Mae West, and Paramount... DO NOT ACCEPT ANY ADVERTISING OF THIS PICTURE." At one point, Hearst asked aloud, "Isn't it time Congress did something about the Mae West menace?" Paramount executives felt they had to tone down the West characterization or face further recrimination. "I was the first liberated woman, you know. No guy was going to get the best of me. That's what I wrote all my scripts about."

Around the same time, West played opposite Randolph Scott in Go West, Young Man (1936). In this film, she adapted Lawrence Riley's Broadway hit Personal Appearance into a screenplay. Directed by Henry Hathaway, Go West, Young Man is considered one of West's weaker films of the era, because of the censor's cuts.

West next starred in Every Day's a Holiday (1937) for Paramount before their association came to an end. The film performed below its goal. Censorship had made West's sexually suggestive brand of humor impossible for the studios to distribute. West, along with other stellar performers, was put on a list of actors called "Box Office Poison" by Harry Brandt on behalf of the Independent Theatre Owners Association. Others on the list were Greta Garbo, Joan Crawford, Marlene Dietrich, Fred Astaire, Dolores del Río, Katharine Hepburn and Kay Francis. The attack was published as a paid advertisement in The Hollywood Reporter, and was taken seriously by the fearful studio executives. The association argued that these stars' high salaries and extreme public popularity did not affect their ticket sales, thus hurt the exhibitors. This did not stop producer David O. Selznick, who next offered West the role of the sage madam Belle Watling, the only woman ever to truly understand Rhett Butler, in Gone with the Wind, after Tallulah Bankhead rejected the role. West also turned down the part, claiming it was too small for an established star and that she would need to rewrite her lines to suit her own persona. The role eventually went to Ona Munson.

In 1939, Universal Studios approached West to star in a film opposite W. C. Fields. The studio was eager to duplicate the success of Destry Rides Again starring Marlene Dietrich and James Stewart, with a comic vehicle starring West and Fields. Having left Paramount 18 months earlier and looking for a new film, West accepted the role of Flower Belle Lee in the film My Little Chickadee (1940). Despite the stars' intense mutual dislike, Fields's very real drinking problems and fights over the screenplay, My Little Chickadee was a box office hit, outgrossing Fields's previous film, You Can't Cheat an Honest Man (1939) and the later The Bank Dick (1940). Despite this, religious leaders condemned West as a negative role model, taking offense at lines such as "When I'm caught between two evils, I generally like to take the one I never tried".

West's next film was Columbia Pictures' The Heat's On (1943). Initially, she did not want to do the film, but after actor, director and friend Gregory Ratoff (producer Max Fabian in All About Eve) pleaded with her and claimed he would go bankrupt if she could not help, West relented as a personal favor. Censors curtailed the sexual burlesque of the West characterization. The studio had orders to raise the neck lines and clean up the double entendres. This was the only film for which West was virtually not allowed to write her own dialogue and, as a result, the film suffered.

Perhaps the most critical, ongoing challenge facing West in her career was censorship of her dialogue. As on Broadway a decade before, by the mid-1930s her risqué and ribald dialogue could no longer be allowed to pass. The Heat's On opened to poor reviews and weak performance at the box office. West was so distraught after the experience and by her years of struggling with the strict Hays Code censorship office, that she would not attempt another film role for the next quarter-century. Instead, West pursued a successful and record-breaking career in top nightclubs, Las Vegas, nationally in theater and on Broadway, where she was allowed, even welcomed, to be herself.

Radio and censorship
On December 12, 1937, West appeared in two separate sketches on ventriloquist Edgar Bergen's radio show The Chase and Sanborn Hour. By the second half of the 1930s, West's popularity was affected by her dialogue being severely censored.  She went on the show eager to promote Every Day's a Holiday. Appearing as herself, West flirted with Charlie McCarthy, Bergen's dummy, using her usual brand of wit and risqué sexual references. West referred to Charlie as "all wood and a yard long" and commented, "Charles, I remember our last date, and have the splinters to prove it!" West was on the verge of being banned from radio.

More outrageous still was an NBC sketch written by Arch Oboler, starring Don Ameche and West as Adam and Eve in the Garden of Eden. She tells Ameche to "get me a big one... I feel like doin' a big apple!" This ostensible reference to the then-current dance craze was one of the many double entendres in the dialogue. Days after the broadcast, the studio received letters calling the show "immoral" and "obscene". Several conservative women's clubs and religious groups admonished the show's sponsor, Chase & Sanborn Coffee Company, for "prostituting" their services for allowing "impurity [to] invade the air".

Under pressure, the Federal Communications Commission later deemed the broadcast "vulgar and indecent" and "far below even the minimum standard which should control in the selection and production of broadcast programs". Some debate existed regarding the reaction to the skit. Conservative religious groups took umbrage far more swiftly than the mainstream. These groups found it easy to make West their target. They took exception to her outspoken use of sexuality and sexual imagery, which she had employed in her career since at least the pre-Code  films of the early 1930s and for decades before on Broadway, but which was now being broadcast into American living rooms on a popular family-friendly radio program.  The groups reportedly warned the sponsor of the program they would protest her appearance.

NBC Radio scapegoated West for the incident and banned her (and the mention of her name) from their stations. They claimed it was not the content of the skit, but West's tonal inflections that gave it the controversial context, acting as though they had hired West knowing nothing of her previous work, nor had any idea of how she would deliver the lines written for her by Oboler. West would not perform in radio for a dozen years, until January 1950, in an episode of The Chesterfield Supper Club, which was hosted by Perry Como. Ameche's career did not suffer any serious repercussions, however, as he was playing the "straight" guy. Nonetheless, Mae West went on to enjoy a record-breaking success in Las Vegas, swank nightclubs such as Lou Walters's The Latin Quarter, Broadway, and London.

Middle years

After appearing in The Heat's On in 1943, West returned to a very active career on stage and in clubs. Among her popular new stage performances was the title role in Catherine Was Great (1944) on Broadway, in which she penned a spoof on the story of Catherine the Great of Russia, surrounding herself with an "imperial guard" of tall, muscular young actors. The play was produced by theater and film impresario Mike Todd (Around The World in 80 Days) and ran for 191 performances and then went on tour.

When Mae West revived her 1928 play Diamond Lil, bringing it back to Broadway in 1949, The New York Times labeled her an "American Institution—as beloved and indestructible as Donald Duck. Like Chinatown, and Grant's Tomb, Mae West should be seen at least once." In the 1950s, West starred in her own Las Vegas stage show at the newly opened Sahara Hotel, singing while surrounded by bodybuilders. The show stood Las Vegas on its head. "Men come to see me, but I also give the women something to see: wall to wall men!" West explained. Jayne Mansfield met and later married one of West's muscle men, former Mr. Universe Mickey Hargitay.

When casting about for the role of Norma Desmond for the 1950 film Sunset Boulevard, Billy Wilder offered West the role. Still smarting from the censorship debacle of The Heat's On, and the constraints placed on her characterization, she declined. The theme of the Wilder film, she noted, was pure pathos, while her brand of comedy was always "about uplifting the audience".  Mae West had a unique comic character that was timeless, in the same way Charlie Chaplin did. After Mary Pickford also declined the role, Gloria Swanson was cast.

In subsequent years, West was offered the role of Vera Simpson, opposite Frank Sinatra, in the 1957 film adaptation of Pal Joey, which she turned down, with the role going to Rita Hayworth. In 1964, West was offered a leading role in Roustabout, starring Elvis Presley. She turned the role down, and Barbara Stanwyck was cast in her place. West was also approached for roles in Frederico Fellini's Juliet of the Spirits and Satyricon, but rejected both offers.

Television, and the next generations
On March 26, 1958, West appeared at the live televised Academy Awards and performed the song "Baby, It's Cold Outside" with Rock Hudson, which received a standing ovation. In 1959, she released an autobiography, Goodness Had Nothing to Do With It, which became a best seller and was reprinted with a new chapter in 1970. West guest-starred on television, including  The Dean Martin Variety Show in 1959 and The Red Skelton Show in 1960, to promote her autobiography, and a lengthy interview on Person to Person with Charles Collingwood in 1959, which never aired. CBS executives felt members of the television audience were not ready to see a nude marble statue of West, which rested on her piano. In 1964, she made a guest appearance on the sitcom Mister Ed. Much later, in 1976, she was interviewed by Dick Cavett and sang two songs on his "Back Lot U.S.A." special on CBS.

Recording career
West's recording career started in the early 1930s with releases of her film songs on shellac 78 rpm records. Most of her film songs were released as 78s, as well as sheet music. In 1955, she recorded her first album, The Fabulous Mae West. In 1965, she recorded two songs, "Am I Too Young" and "He's Good for Me", for a 45 rpm record released by Plaza Records. She recorded several tongue-in-cheek songs, including "Santa, Come Up to See Me", on the album Wild Christmas, which was released in 1966 and reissued as Mae in December in 1980. Demonstrating her willingness to keep in touch with the contemporary scene, in 1966 she recorded Way Out West, the first of her two rock-and-roll albums. The second, released in 1972 on MGM Records and titled Great Balls of Fire, covered songs by The Doors, among others, and had songs written for West by English songwriter-producer Ian Whitcomb.

Later years
After a 27-year absence from motion pictures, West appeared as Leticia Van Allen in Gore Vidal's Myra Breckinridge (1970) with Raquel Welch, Rex Reed, Farrah Fawcett, and Tom Selleck in a small part. The movie was intended to be deliberately campy sex change comedy, but had serious production problems, resulting in a botched film that was both a box-office and critical failure. Author Vidal, at great odds with inexperienced and self-styled "art film" director Michael Sarne, later called the film "an awful joke". Though Mae West was given star billing to attract ticket buyers, her scenes were truncated by the inexperienced film editor, and her songs were filmed as though they were merely side acts. Mae West's counterculture appeal (she was dubbed "the queen of camp"), included the young and hip, and by 1971, the student body of University of California, Los Angeles (UCLA) voted Mae West "Woman of the Century" in honor of her relevance as a pioneering advocate of sexual frankness and courageous crusader against censorship.

In 1975, West released her book Sex, Health, and ESP (William Allen & Sons, publisher), and Pleasure Man (Dell publishers) based on her 1928 play of the same name. Her autobiography, Goodness Had Nothing to Do with It, was also updated and republished in the 1970s.

Mae West was a shrewd investor, produced her own stage acts, and invested her money in large tracts of land in Van Nuys, a thriving suburb of Los Angeles. With her considerable fortune, she could afford to do as she liked. In 1976, she appeared on Back Lot U.S.A. on CBS, where she was interviewed by Dick Cavett and sang "Frankie and Johnny" along with "After You've Gone." That same year, she began work on her final film, Sextette (1978). Adapted from a 1959 script written by West, the film's daily revisions and production disagreements hampered production from the beginning. Because of the near-endless last-minute script changes and tiring production schedule, West agreed to have her lines signaled to her through a speaker concealed in her hair piece. Despite the daily problems, West was, according to Sextette director Ken Hughes, determined to see the film through.  At 84, her now-failing eyesight made navigating around the set difficult, but she made it through the filming, a tribute to her self-confidence, remarkable endurance, and stature as a self-created star 67 years after her Broadway debut in 1911 at the age of 18. Time magazine wrote an article on the indomitable star entitled "At 84, Mae West Is Still Mae West".

Upon its release, Sextette was not a critical or commercial success, but has a diverse cast. The cast included some of West's first co-stars such as George Raft (Night After Night, 1932), silver screen stars such as Walter Pidgeon and Tony Curtis, and more contemporary pop stars such as The Beatles' Ringo Starr and Alice Cooper, and television favorites such as Dom DeLuise and gossip queen Rona Barrett.  It also included cameos of some of the musclemen from her 1950s Las Vegas show, such as the still remarkably fit Reg Lewis. Sextette also reunited Mae West with Edith Head, her costume designer from 1933 in She Done Him Wrong.

For her contribution to the film industry, Mae West has a star on the Hollywood Walk of Fame at 1560 Vine Street in Hollywood. For her contributions as a stage actor in the theater world, she has been inducted into the American Theater Hall of Fame.

Public image

Mae West was noted for her "voluptuous figure". The Mae West look has been described as "a figure-hugging floor-length gown with a very low neckline and the figure to fill it." Noted features were the fishtail train and feather trim.

Personal life

West was married on April 11, 1911, in Milwaukee, Wisconsin to Frank Szatkus (1892–1966), whose stage name was Frank Wallace, a fellow vaudevillian whom she met in 1909. She was 17. She kept the marriage a secret, but a filing clerk discovered the marriage certificate in 1935 and alerted the press. The clerk also uncovered an affidavit in which she had declared herself married, made during the Sex trial in 1927. At first, West denied ever marrying Wallace, but she finally admitted it in July 1937, in reply to a legal interrogatory. The couple never lived together as husband and wife. She insisted that they had separate bedrooms, and she soon sent him away in a show of his own to get rid of him. She obtained a legal divorce on July 21, 1942, during which Wallace withdrew his request for separate maintenance, and West testified that Wallace and she had lived together for only "several weeks". The final divorce decree was granted on May 7, 1943.

In August 1913, she met Guido Deiro (1886–1950), an Italian-born vaudeville headliner and piano-accordion star. Her affair, and possible 1914 marriage to him, as alleged by Deiro's son Guido Roberto Deiro in his 2019 book Mae West and The Count, went "very deep, hittin' on all the emotions". According to the American Masters documentary Mae West: Dirty Blonde, West aborted Deiro's child on the advice of her mother, the procedure nearly killing her and leaving her infertile. The younger Deiro said that his father was devastated when he learned about the abortion and ended the relationship. West later said, "Marriage is a great institution. I'm not ready for an institution."

In 1916, when she was a vaudeville actress, West had a relationship with James Timony (1884–1954), an attorney nine years her senior. Timony was also her manager. By the time that she was an established movie actress in the mid-1930s, they were no longer a couple. West and Timony remained extremely close, living in the same building, working together, and providing support for each other until Timony's death in 1954.

West had a relationship with the Cotton Club's Owney Madden, who did not "date" the chorus girls.

West remained close to her family throughout her life and was devastated by her mother's death in 1930. In 1930, she moved to Hollywood and into the penthouse at The Ravenswood apartment building where she lived until her death in 1980. Her sister, brother, and father followed her to Hollywood where she provided them with nearby homes, jobs, and sometimes financial support. Among her boyfriends was boxing champion William Jones, nicknamed Gorilla Jones (1906–1982). The management at her Ravenswood apartment building barred the African American boxer from entering the premises; West solved the problem by buying the building and lifting the ban.

She became romantically involved at age 61 with Chester Rybinski (1923–1999), one of the muscle men in her Las Vegas stage show—a wrestler, former Mr. California, and former merchant sailor. He was 30 years younger than her, and later changed his name to Paul Novak. He moved in with her, and their romance continued until her death in 1980 at age 87. Novak once commented, "I believe I was put on this Earth to take care of Mae West." West was a Presbyterian.

West would sometimes speak of "Mae West" as the entertainment character she had created.

Death

In August 1980, West tripped while getting out of bed. After the fall, she was unable to speak, and was taken to Good Samaritan Hospital in Los Angeles, where tests revealed that she had suffered a stroke. She died on November 22, 1980, at the age of 87.

A private service was held at the church in Forest Lawn, Hollywood Hills, on November 25, 1980. Bishop Andre Penachio, a friend, officiated at the entombment in the family mausoleum at Cypress Hills Cemetery, Brooklyn, purchased in 1930 when her mother died. Her father and brother were also entombed there before her, and her younger sister, Beverly, was laid to rest in the last of the five crypts less than 18 months after West's death.

In popular culture
 In the 1937 film Stand-In, the stage mother (Anne O'Neal) who has her young daughter (Marianne Edwards) auditioning for Dodd (Leslie Howard) tells her: "Now, do the Mae West number".
 Within New York State, an electrical conduit hanger strap is commonly referred to as a "Mae West". 
 During World War II, Allied aircrews called their yellow inflatable, vest-like life preserver jackets "Mae Wests" partly from rhyming slang for "breasts" and "life vests" and partly because of the resemblance to her torso. A "Mae West" is also a type of round parachute malfunction (partial inversion) which contorts the shape of the canopy into the appearance of an extraordinarily large brassiere.
 West has been the subject of songs, including the title song of Cole Porter's Broadway musical Anything Goes and in "You're the Top".
 Surrealist artist Salvador Dalí painted works entitled "Face of Mae West which may be Used as an Apartment", and the Mae West Lips Sofa, which was also by Salvador Dalí and completed in 1938 for Edward James.
 When approached for permission to allow her likeness on The Beatles' Sgt. Pepper's Lonely Hearts Club Band album cover, West initially refused, asking "What would I be doing in a Lonely Heart's Club?" The Beatles wrote her a personal letter declaring themselves great admirers of the star and persuaded her to change her mind.
 Throughout the parody musical Wild Side Story (1973–2004) a large amount of Mae West comedy lines intersperse the action to spice up the parody.
 In 1982 actress Ann Jillian portrayed West in a television bio film, Mae West.  
 In 2000 Dirty Blonde, written by Claudia Shear, opened on Broadway at the Helen Hayes Theater.
 MAE-West – "Metropolitan Area Exchange, West", a former Internet exchange point on the west coast of the United States, with a corresponding MAE-East exchange point.
 In 2016, Mae West was portrayed by drag star Alaska in the second episode of the second season of RuPaul's Drag Race All Stars.
 In 2017, Mae West was the subject of an episode of the TV comedy series Over My Dead Body on Amazon Prime.
West was the subject of the 2020 PBS documentary Mae West: Dirty Blonde as part of their American Masters series. The documentary was produced by Bette Midler.
 A May West is a Canadian dessert cake named after West. In the 1980s the spelling was changed from Mae West to May West. The snack is still very popular in Quebec, Eastern and Southern Ontario.

Broadway stage

Filmography

Discography
Albums:
 1956: The Fabulous Mae West; Decca D/DL-79016 (several reissues up to 2006)
 1960: W.C. Fields His Only Recording Plus 8 Songs by Mae West; Proscenium PR 22
 1966: Way Out West; Tower T/ST-5028
 1966: Wild Christmas; Dragonet LPDG-48
 1970: The Original Voice Tracks from Her Greatest Movies; Decca D/DL-791/76
 1970: Mae West & W.C. Fields Side by Side; Harmony HS 11374/HS 11405
 1972: Great Balls of Fire; MGM SE 4869
 1974: Original Radio Broadcasts; Mark 56 Records 643
 1987/1995: Sixteen Sultry Songs Sung by Mae West Queen of Sex; Rosetta RR 1315
 1996: I'm No Angel; Jasmine CD 04980 102
 2006: The Fabulous: Rev-Ola CR Rev 181
At least 21 singles (78 rpm and 45 rpm) were released from 1933 to 1973.

Written works
  (the novel on which The Constant Sinner was based)
  (novelization of play)

See also

References

 

 https://www.newyorker.com/magazine/1928/11/10/mae-west-profile-diamond-lil

External links

 
 
 

 
1893 births
1980 deaths
Age controversies
20th-century American actresses
20th-century American comedians
20th-century American dramatists and playwrights
20th-century American singers
20th-century American women writers
20th-century American women singers
Actresses from New York (state)
American burlesque performers
American contraltos
American film actresses
American people of English descent
American people of German descent
American people of Irish descent
American people of Scottish descent
American Presbyterians
American stage actresses
American television actresses
American vedettes
American women comedians
American women dramatists and playwrights
American women screenwriters
Burials at Cypress Hills Cemetery
Illeists
Musicians from Brooklyn
People from Woodhaven, Queens
Paramount Pictures contract players
Screenwriters from New York (state)
Vaudeville performers
20th-century American screenwriters